Abbey Gate College is an independent school in Chester, Cheshire, England for pupils aged 4 – 18 years. The infant and junior school is based in the village of Aldford,  from the senior school in Saighton.

Notable former pupils
Seb Morris, British GT Championship driver

See also
Listed buildings in Saighton

References

Private schools in Cheshire West and Chester